Route 138 is the portion of the  multi-state Route 138 within the state of Connecticut. It is one of several New England state highways that travel through three states while keeping their number designation. The route begins in Sprague at Route 97. From its western terminus up to the junction with Interstate 395 in Griswold, the road functions as a collector road. From the Interstate 395 junction, it then enters Voluntown, and continues into the state of Rhode Island as Route 138.

Route description

Route 138 starts at Route 97, in the town of Sprague, where it is known as Bushnell Hollow Road. It heads east into the town of Lisbon becoming Kinsman Road and Town House Road. It intersects with Route 169 in Lisbon center and then becomes Newent Road, as it proceeds eastward.
Route 138 overlaps with Route 12 as it crosses the Griswold town line. Route 138 splits off from Route 12 as Slater Avenue and later as Pachaug Road. It has an interchange with I-395 in the borough of Jewett City and intersects with Route 201 just west of the town line. The road continues into the town of Voluntown, where it becomes Jewett City Road. It has a three-way overlap with Route 165 and Route 49, along Beach Pond Road. Route 138 continues east as Rockville Road into the state of Rhode Island, becoming Rhode Island Route 138.

History
In the 1920s, a loop route of New England Route 12 from south of Taftville to Jewett City via the village of Newent was a secondary state highway known as Highway 356. At the same time, the road connecting Jewett City and the town center of Voluntown was known as Highway 321. In the 1932 state highway renumbering, Route 138 was established from the piece of old Highway 356 from Newent to Jewett City and from the entire length of old Highway 321. Route 138 was extended to the Rhode Island state line in 1938 along former SR 420, where it connected with the westward extension of Rhode Island Route 138, which had originally ended in Newport. This resulted in a three-state Route 138 all the way to the Boston area. Route 138 in Connecticut was extended west to its current western terminus located at Route 97 in 1962 as part of the Route Reclassification Act.

Junction list

References

External links

138
Transportation in New London County, Connecticut